Manuel Guillermo Márquez Lizalde (born 25 June 1961) is a Mexican politician from the Institutional Revolutionary Party. From 2009 to 2012 he served as Deputy of the LXI Legislature of the Mexican Congress representing Chihuahua.

References

1961 births
Living people
Politicians from Chihuahua (state)
Institutional Revolutionary Party politicians
21st-century Mexican politicians
Autonomous University of Chihuahua alumni
Academic staff of the Autonomous University of Chihuahua
Members of the Congress of Chihuahua
Municipal presidents in Chihuahua (state)
People from Delicias, Chihuahua
Deputies of the LXI Legislature of Mexico
Members of the Chamber of Deputies (Mexico) for Chihuahua (state)